Larry Estridge (born 17 June 1902, St. Kitts, British West Indies) was a middleweight boxer and the last holder of the World Colored Middleweight Championship. The 5'7" middleweight fought out of New York City from 1922 to 1929, racking up a career record of 53 wins against 23 losses and two draws from 1922 to 1929.

Estridge fought African-American middleweight champion Panama Joe Gans for his title on July 26, 1924 at Yankee Stadium, defeating the champ via a unanimous decision in their 10-round bout. After scoring two victories over heavyweight Frank Yarchan, Estridge had a rematch with Gans for the colored title. On 11 August 1924 in Queensboro Stadium in Queens, New York, Estridge defeated Gans on points. It was his last defense of the title, which went into abeyance as African American Tiger Flowers won the world middleweight crown the following year.

Estridge never earned a shot at the world title. His status as a contender began to decline after he lost to future light-heavyweight champion Paul Berlenbach on 26 December 1924. Larry Estridge, who weight 155¾ lbs. to Berlenbach's  163¾ lbs., lost via a T.K.O. in the second round. His record was 38–2–1 at the time. Estridge won his next three fights but lost to Frankie Schoell on 13 March 1925, when they appeared as part of the undercard at Madison Square Garden that was topped by a fight between Berlenbach and former world light-heavyweight champion Battling Siki.

Estridge again won three fights before to losing to Sergeant Sammy Baker on 1 June 1925. He then racked up a record of six victories, three losses and a draw in his next 10 fights before he met Baker again on 7 May 1926. Baker K.O.-ed him in the second round, the first of 13 straight defeats. In his last loss of the streak, and the penultimate fight of his career, his former nemesis Paul Berlenbach K.O.-ed him in the eighth round of their fight on 22 May 1928. His last fight was against lightly regarded Mickey Taylor on 21 February 1929, whom he scored a T.K.O. against in the fifth round.

Professional boxing record
All information in this section is derived from BoxRec, unless otherwise stated.

Official record

All newspaper decisions are officially regarded as “no decision” bouts and are not counted in the win/loss/draw column.

Unofficial record

Record with the inclusion of newspaper decisions in the win/loss/draw column.

References

External links

1902 births
Middleweight boxers
World colored middleweight boxing champions
Year of death missing
British male boxers
British expatriates in the United States
Saint Kitts and Nevis emigrants to the United Kingdom